John Robertson Auld (7 January 1862 – 29 April 1932) was a Scottish footballer who played for Third Lanark, Queen's Park, Sunderland, Newcastle United and Scotland as a central defender.

Club career
Starting his career in Kilmarnock, Auld also played for Scottish clubs Lugar Boswell, Third Lanark (two spells, winning the Scottish Cup in 1889 during the second) and Queen's Park before moving to England.

He played for Sunderland from 1890 to 1896 where he won two Football League championships in 1891–92 and 1892–93, plus the 'World Championship' in 1895 (he made only four appearances in the 1894–95 title-winning campaign which preceded that match, and none at all in the next season). After making 115 league and FA Cup appearances (scoring seven goals), Auld became the first player to leave Sunderland for their arch rivals, Newcastle United. Now in his mid-30s, after one Second Division season as a player at the Magpies, he retired and became a director of the club.

International career
Auld gained his first cap for Scotland on 19 March 1887 against England where they won 3–2. He went on to make three appearances for his country, withiut scoring; all came during his time at Third Lanark, as English-based players were not selected by the Scottish Football Association until 1896, so despite his success at Sunderland he was deemed ineligible for international selection, along with the rest of their 'team of all talents' squad which was almost entirely Scottish. He also played in an unofficial match against Canada in 1888, and represented the Glasgow FA in matches against other regions which were common at the time.

References

Sources

1862 births
1932 deaths
Scottish footballers
Footballers from East Ayrshire
Scotland international footballers
Sunderland A.F.C. players
Newcastle United F.C. players
Third Lanark A.C. players
Association football central defenders
English Football League players
Kilmarnock F.C. players
Lugar Boswell Thistle F.C. players
Queen's Park F.C. players
Newcastle United F.C. directors and chairmen